Abbasa bint al-Mahdi (765 – after 803) was a famous Abbasid princess. She was the daughter of Abbasid caliph al-Mahdi, sister of caliph Musa al-Hadi and Harun al-Rashid.

Life
Abbasa was the daughter of the third Abbasid caliph, al-Mahdi, and a concubine by the name of Rahim, thus she was the mother of his oldest surviving girl child, Abbasa. She was the half-sister of al-Hadi, Harun al-Rashid, Ulayya, and Ibrahim ibn al-Mahdi. 

She was born during her grandfather reign, her father became caliph in 775. When Abbasa was a young her father arranged her marriage to a cadet member of Abbasid House. 

Her husband was Muhammad ibn Sulayman, a prominent member of a cadet branch of the Abbasid dynasty, who was a long-time governor of Kufa and Basra. however her husband died and Abbasa became a widow.

She married again another Abbasid member during the reign of her brother Harun al-Rashid.

Her second marriage was with Ibrahim ibn Salih, a member of another cadet branch of the Abbasid dynasty: he was a first cousin to the first two Abbasid caliphs al-Saffah and al-Mansur.

Siblings
Abbasa was related to Abbasid house both by birth and through marriage like all other Abbasid princess. She was contemporary and related to several Abbasid caliphs, princes and princesses.

Myths and Legends
Harun al-Rashid was known for being unhappy with the fact that he was a relative of Abassa's, as he was attracted to her. To keep Abassa in his life, he had her marry Ja'far ibn Yahya. The marriage was supposed to be one of convenience, but Abassa fell in love with her arranged husband. At night, a slave woman would be sent to Ja'far's bedroom, and Abassa took the slave woman's place one evening. Her husband was surprised. Abassa would get pregnant and give birth to twin boys in secret. The twins would be raised in Mecca. Harun eventually found out about the relationship, and had Ja'far killed. Abassa was either killed, or, sent into exile.

References

Sources
 
 
 
 
 
 
 
 

760s births
8th-century women from the Abbasid Caliphate
9th-century women from the Abbasid Caliphate
Year of death unknown
Daughters of Abbasid caliphs
9th-century deaths